The term Zille (plural Zillen) is used for a family of flat-bottomed vessels which are used in the Danube River regions of Germany and Austria.

Description

Zillen are simply constructed boats, between five and 30 meters long. Smaller Zillen are generally open, while larger Zillen for freight or passenger transport have house-like structures amidships. Zillen have a flat floor and straight side walls. The front of the boat usually tapers. Depending on the type, the tail of the Zille may be either narrow or wide.  For the past several decades, the tail has been used a mount point for motorized operation.

The Zille has a very shallow draft and is relatively stable and secure against tipping. Zillen can be driven by a motor or rowed.  Historically, Zillen carrying freight were also towed or propelled by sails.

The length of today's Zillen rarely exceeds 10 meters, but in the 19th century Zillen used for freight were often more than 30 meters long. Included in the Zillen family are slim boats with a pointed bow and stern as well as small "Schugge" with wide ends and a "Stock Zillen" with a  similar design to other Zillen in front and a wide rear bulkhead that opens and closes for loading and unloading. Boats with a wider aft area are also called "Plätte"; they fall under the general classification of "Zillen".

History

Early Zillen were a maximum of 22 meters long and 3 meters wide, but their dimensions increased with time. In the late 19th century they reached sizes of up to 30 meters in length and 7.5 meters wide. The hulls of these boats had a height of about 1.5 meters.  Centered on the ship there was a large wooden hut.

Zillen were used in many areas of the Danube.

Modern usage and construction

The Zille is still used today as a working, fishing and recreational boat. As in earlier times, they are built from soft wood, mainly larch and spruce. Production facilities for Zillen are mainly in the Upper Austrian Danube in the Engelhartszell area. On the northern bank of the Danube there are two family businesses that have been building Zillen for several centuries. The sizes produced in these facilities are typically around 4 to 12 meters in length, but they are capable of producing much larger Zillen on order. The shipbuilders offer some fixed Zillen types, such as a Zille for firefighters, in standardized dimensions. All other Zillen are tailored individually and for the respective application. This flexibility is still the strength of this boat type. Due to the simple design rules compared to contemporary designs, Zillen manufacturing has a very favorable price-performance ratio. The proverbial robustness of Zillen offers good reason for the continued existence and use of this traditional watercraft.

Annual Zillen championships are held in regional centers.

The uses of Zillen are as diverse as their design: Zillen were and are used for fishing, as workboats in hydraulic engineering, as operational and rescue vehicles, as ferries, and for fire fighting. They are traditionally used for transport of both goods and passengers. Zillen are used as transport vehicles in gravel and sand extraction.

References

Further reading 
 Jenny Sarrazin, André van Holk: Schopper und Zillen. Eine Einführung in den traditionellen Holzschiffbau im Gebiet der deutschen Donau. (Schopper and Zillen. An introduction to the traditional wooden ship building on the German Danube.) Kabel Verlag, Hamburg 1996, .
 Karl Ebner: Flöszerei und Schiffahrt auf Binnengewässern mit besonderer Berücksichtigung der Holztransporte in Österreich, Deutschland und Westruszland. (Rafting and ship transport on inland waterways with special emphasis on wood transport in Austria, Germany, and western Russia.) Wien und Leipzig 1912
 Ernst Neweklowsky: Die Schiffahrt auf der Donau und ihren Nebenflüssen. (Navigation on the Danube and its tributaries.) In: Deutsches Museum. Berichte und Abhandlungen, 26. Jg., Heft 3. 1952
 Michael Sohn: Kaffenkähne. Eine vergangene Binnenschiffsform. (Coffee barges. A historical type of barge.)  Eigenverlag Sohn-Art, Hennigsdorf 2013, .
 Kurt Schaefer: Historische Schiffe in Wien. (Historical ships in Vienna.) Neuer Wissenschaftlicher Verlag GmbH, 2002, .

External links 

 Bauplan einer Zille beim "Österreichischem Zillensport-Verband" (ÖZSV) (Construction plan for a Zille from the Austrian Zillensport Association.)
 Geschichte-Tirol: Binnenschiffahrt im Hoch- und Spätmittelalter (History of Tirol: Inland ship transportation in high and late Middle Ages)
The "Ulmer Schachtel" (Ulm Box), still celebrated annually in the city of Ulm: http://lanajim.com/geneology/historical/ulmer_schachtel.htm
 http://www.sdtb.de/Schifffahrt.93.0.html
 http://www.duc-berlin.de/kaffenkahn.htm
 https://web.archive.org/web/20140117062345/http://www.euregio-inntal.com:80/handelsweg-inn/handelsstadt-rosenheim

Barges
Danube
Water transport in Austria
Water transport in Germany
Boat building

it:Chiatta